Unity State, also known as Western Upper Nile, is a state in South Sudan. Unity state is in the Greater Upper Nile region. Unity is inhabited predominantly by two ethnic groups: the Nuer majority, and the Dinka minority.

In 2015, a presidential decree established a new system of 28 states, replacing the previously established 10. Unity state was replaced by the states of Ruweng, Northern Liech and Southern Liech. Unity State was re-established by a peace agreement signed on 22 February 2020 with smaller boundaries as the northern part of the former state became the Ruweng Administrative Area.

Administrative divisions
The capital of Unity state is Bentiu. Before an administrative reorganization in 1994, Unity was part of a much larger province of Upper Nile, and the state was sometimes called Western Upper Nile. 
 
The counties of Unity were:
 Guit County
 Koch County
 Leer County
 Mayiandit County
 Mayom County
 Panyijar County
 Rubkona County

The larger towns were Bentiu, Mayom, Rubkona and Leer.

Other towns were Riangnom, Rub-Koni, Yoahnyang, Tam, Mankien, Wang-Kay, Koch, Nyal and Ganyliel.

Economy

Agriculture was the state's primary economic activity. The people of the state were nomadic agro-pastoralists who engaged in both agriculture and rearing of livestock, especially cattle. Farming was conducted during the rainy season although some cultivation also occurs during summer. Vegetables were not widely cultivated as most farmers were rural rather than urban and therefore lacked access to markets for their produce. Some NGOs introduced farmers to the practice of cultivation for market.

Oil fields
Southern Sudan's first oil reserves were discovered here during the 1970s. The international oil companies which engaged in oil exploration contributed to massive displacement of the indigenous population.

In the state were some rich oilfields, including Unity oilfield and most of Block 5A. The Unity oilfield is within the largest hydrocarbon accumulation in the Muglad rift basin and contains an estimated  of oil.

The Greater Nile Oil Pipeline begins in the Unity oilfield.

See also
2007 Sudan floods
Greater Nile Oil Pipeline

References

External links
 USAID 2001, 'Sudan: Oil and gas concession holders' (map), University of Texas Library. (Map shows location of oil field. Note that state borders are out of date.)

 
States of South Sudan
Greater Upper Nile